Shibpur is a village located on North Andaman Island of the Andaman & Nicobar Islands in India. Administratively, it is a part of Diglipur tehsil of North and Middle Andaman district.

There is a 1 km long Indian Navy airstrip next to the village at INS Kohassa.

References

Villages in North and Middle Andaman district